Kurort, is a railway station in Sestroretsk, Russia.

The station was constructed simultaneously with the sanatorium, the Sestroretsk Kurort.

References 

Railway stations in Saint Petersburg